Acoustic Garden is a studio album by American musicians Tingstad and Rumbel, released on August 13, 2002 by Narada Records and recorded in April 2002. It received the Grammy Award for Best New Age Album at the 45th Grammy Awards in 2003.

Track listing 
"Acoustic Garden" (Rumbel, Tingstad) – 4:19
"Blue Martini" (Rumbel, Tingstad) – 3:36
"Shamrock" (Rumbel, Tingstad) – 3:55
"Deep in My Soul" (Rumbel, Tingstad) – 3:37
"Empire Builder" (Rumbel, Tingstad) – 3:56
"Clear Moon, Quiet Winds" (Rumbel, Tingstad) – 3:43
"Prairie Schooner" (Rumbel, Tingstad) – 4:07
"Les Jardins de Nohant" (Rumbel) – 4:00
"Havana" (Rumbel, Tingstad) – 3:40
"San Antonio" (Rumbel) – 4:05
"Drayton Hall" (Rumbel) – 3:53
"Windows on the World" (Rumbel, Tingstad) – 4:40
"Talk of Angels" (Tingstad) – 3:09

Personnel
Les Kahn – engineering
Nancy Rumbel – production, woodwind
Eric Tingstad – engineering, acoustic guitar, production

Charts

References

2002 albums
Albums produced by Tingstad and Rumbel
Tingstad and Rumbel albums